Natalya Borisovna Vetoshnikova (born   1921) is a Soviet tennis player. Master of Sports of the USSR. USSR champion in singles (1937 and 1939), and doubles (1939).

Survived by Siege of Leningrad.

In mixed doubles performed with Nikolai Ozerov.

In 2013, Natalya Borisovna entered the Russian Tennis Hall of Fame.

Author of the book Tennis in My Life: Memories (2010).

References

External links
 История общества «Динамо»
 Legends light up St. Petersburg 

1921 births
Living people
Sportspeople from Saint Petersburg
Soviet female tennis players
Russian centenarians
Women centenarians
Russian memoirists
Academic staff of Saint Petersburg State University